Macdonald Duck Eclair (sometimes spelled Mac Donald Duck Eclair and usually written in Latin script) is a Japanese "pico-pico" or picopop band associated with such groups as Micro Mach Machine and Miss Wonda and sounding similar to such groups as DAT politics etc. Based in Tokyo, they have been making music since 1999. The lead vocalist, known only as "Michi", has also worked with the girl group "Spoochy." The two other members are Yuki Shimamura and Toyomu Futamata, both of whom compose. Their unique sound combines electronic elements with French pop style vocals, noisy punk guitars and poppy keyboard melodies. They are signed to the Japanese Indie label Usagi Chang Records and have released two full-length albums to date. They first became known for their high energy single "Mac Teenage Riot" on the Usagi Chang Records sampler, "Killer Killer Usagi Chang" in 2003. The single is a tribute to the group Atari Teenage Riot both stylistically and in that it extensively quotes songs from the album 60 Second Wipeout. Their first album, Short Short, was released in 2004 and their second, darker album, The Genesis Songbook was released in 2005. They have also collaborated with Valvola, Kylie Minogue, Iggy Pop, and Hong Kong Counterfeit among others to create the electroclash and disco album "The Electronic Tomato" released in 2004 on SHADO records. Their slogan is "Lolli, pico'tte, macin' rock."

External links
Official site
Usagi Chang Records site

Japanese electronic music groups
Musical groups from Tokyo